Please add names of notable painters with a Wikipedia page, in precise English alphabetical order, using U.S. spelling conventions. Country and regional names refer to where painters worked for long periods, not to personal allegiances.

 Aileen Eagleton (1902–1984), English painter
 Thomas Eakins (1844–1916), American realist painter, photographer, sculptor and fine arts educator
 Ralph Earl (1751–1801), American portrait painter
 Augustus Earle (1793–1838), English traveling artist
 Alfred East (1849–1913), English painter
 Christoffer Wilhelm Eckersberg (1783–1853), Danish painter
 Otto Eckmann (1865–1902), German painter and graphic artist
 Don Eddy (born 1944), American painter and photo-realist
 Albert Edelfelt (1854–1905), Finnish painter
 Denis Eden (1878–1949), English painter and illustrator
 Ursula Edgcumbe (1900–1985), English sculptor and painter
 Edith Edmonds (1874–1951), English still-life and landscape painter
 Robert Edmonstone (1794–1834), Scottish painter and draftsman
 May de Montravel Edwardes (1887–1967), English painter and miniaturist
 Helen Edwards (1882–1963), English landscape painter
 John Uzzell Edwards (1934–2014), Welsh painter
 Gerbrand van den Eeckhout (1621–1674), Dutch painter
 Camilo Egas (1889–1962), Ecuadorian/American painter and teacher
 Maude Kaufman Eggemeyer (1877–1959) American painter
 Albin Egger-Lienz (1868–1926), Austrian painter of rustic and historical paintings
 József Egry (1883–1951), Hungarian painter
 Ei-Q (瑛九, 1911–1960), Japanese artist, photographer and engraver
 Louis Eilshemius (1864–1941), American painter
 Einar Hakonarson (born 1945), Icelandic painter
 Eishōsai Chōki (栄松斎長喜, fl. 1786–1808), Japanese woodblock print designer
 Ib Eisner (1925–2003), Danish artist
 Eizan Kikukawa (菊川英山, 1787–1867) Japanese woodblock print designer
 Bouchta El Hayani (born 1952), Moroccan painter
 Mildred Eldridge (1909–1991), English painter, muralist and illustrator
 Ken Elias (born 1944), Welsh artist
 Pieter Janssens Elinga (1623–1682), Dutch painter
 Harold Elliott (1890–1968), Canadian painter
 Clifford Ellis (1907–1985), English painter, print-maker and art teacher
 Adam Elsheimer (1578–1610), German artist of cabinet paintings
 Arthur Webster Emerson, American painter
 Tracey Emin (born 1963), English painter, draftsman and sculptor
 Paul Emmert (1826–1867), Swiss/American artist and print-maker
 Lydia Field Emmet (1866–1952), American portrait painter
 Rosalie Emslie (1891–1977), English landscape and portrait painter
 Cornelis Engebrechtsz (1462–1527), Dutch painter
 Florence Engelbach (1872–1951), English portrait and landscape painter
 Grace English (1891–1956), English painter and etcher
 Ron English (born 1948), American artist of brand imagery
 Carlos Enríquez Gómez (1900–1957), Cuban painter, illustrator and writer
 James Ensor (1860–1949), Belgian painter and print-maker
 Ben Enwonwu (1921–1994), Nigerian painter and sculptor
 Sir Jacob Epstein (1880–1959), American/English sculptor
 Sven Erixson (1899–1970), Swedish painter and sculptor
 Hans Erni (born 1909), Swiss graphic designer, painter and engraver
 Max Ernst (1891–1976), German painter, sculptor, graphic artist, and poet
 Rodolfo Escalera (1929–2000), Mexican artist and plate collector
 M. C. Escher (1898–1972), Dutch graphic artist
 Andrey Esionov (born 1963), Russian painter and graphic artist
 Robert Lee Eskridge (1891–1975), American genre painter, muralist and illustrator
 Jacob Esselens (1626–1687), Dutch landscape painter
 Richard Estes (born 1936), American artist and photo-realist painter
 Bracha L. Ettinger (born 1948), Israeli/French painter and writer
 William Etty (1787–1849), English history painter
 Bernard Walter Evans (1843–1922), British landscape painter
 Cerith Wyn Evans (born 1958), Welsh artist, sculptor and film-maker
 Dulah Marie Evans (1875–1951), American painter, print-maker and etcher
 Vincent Evans (1896–1976), Welsh painter, print-maker and art teacher
 Eamon Everall (born 1948), English artist and educator
 Allaert van Everdingen (1621–1675) Dutch painter and print-maker
 Caesar van Everdingen (1617–1678), Dutch portrait and history painter
 Philip Evergood (1901–1971), American artist, sculptor and writer
 Mikhail Evstafiev (born 1963), Soviet/Russian artist, photographer and writer
 Peter Maxwell Ewart (1918–2001), Canadian painter
 Julius Exner (1863–1939), Danish genre painter
 Barthélemy d'Eyck (1420–after 1470), Netherlandish/French artist and manuscript illuminator
 Hubert van Eyck (1385–1426), Netherlandish painter
 Jan van Eyck (1390–1441), Netherlandish painter
 John Eyre (1771–1812), Australian painter and engraver
 Annabel Eyres (born 1965), English print-maker and painter
 Carl Eytel (1862–1925), German/American landscape painter and illustrator

References
References can be found under each entry.

E